Leszek Bednarczuk  (May 30, 1936 in Vilnius) is a Polish linguist, Indo-Europeanist, professor of the Pedagogical University of Cracow since 1987, and member of the Polish Academy of Sciences. Bednarczuk is an author of a 2010 book Językowy obraz Wielkiego Księstwa Litewskiego.

References

1936 births
Living people
Linguists from Poland
Indo-Europeanists
20th-century linguists
21st-century linguists
Polish male writers
People from Vilnius
People from Wilno Voivodeship (1926–1939)
20th-century male writers